New Alsace is an unincorporated community in Kelso Township, Dearborn County, Indiana.

History
New Alsace was laid out in 1838. It was named after Alsace, in France.

A post office was established at New Alsace in 1845, and remained in operation until it was discontinued in 1904.

Geography

Notable people
 Joe Benz, Major League Baseball pitcher

References

Unincorporated communities in Dearborn County, Indiana
Unincorporated communities in Indiana
1838 establishments in Indiana
Populated places established in 1838